Metarctia pulverea is a moth of the subfamily Arctiinae. It was described by George Hampson in 1907. It is found in the Democratic Republic of the Congo, Rwanda and Uganda.

References

 

Metarctia
Moths described in 1907